This is a list of Northern Territory by-elections, with the names of the departing and new members and their respective parties.

Gains for the Labor Party are highlighted in red, and for the Northern Territory Nationals in green.

See also
 Northern Territory Legislative Assembly
 Members of the Northern Territory Legislative Assembly
 Northern Territory ministries

Northern Territory by-elections
Northern Territory
By-elections